Deric Michael Angelettie (born July 31, 1968), otherwise known as D-Dot, Papa Dot, and Madd Rapper, is an American artist, music producer, songwriter, TV & film producer and entrepreneur. He is the winner of The Grammy's NARAS Governor's New Horizon Award for "Producer Of The Year" in 1998 and an BMI Urban Award winner in 2001. He has Executive Produced and A&R'd two Grammy nominated albums and one Grammy winning album for Best Rap Album, No Way Out by Puff Daddy & The Family.

While attending Howard University in the late 80ʼs, D-Dot and Ron “Amen-Ra” Lawrence, formed the conscious rap duo Two Kings In A Cipher and in 1991 released their debut album "From Pyramids to Projects" on Bahia/RCA.

D-Dot was the "Captain" of Sean “Puffy” Combsʼ, Badboy Entertainmentʼs producing team: The Hitmen. As a producer, D-Dot produced songs for artists such as The Notorious B.I.G., Jay-Z, Eminem, Mary J. Blige and 50 Cent among others. He produced mega hits such as The Notorious B.I.G.ʼs "Hypnotize" and Diddyʼs "It's All About The Benjamins". D-Dot has sold over 50 million records as a producer, songwriter, and artist.

He created the character, The Madd Rapper, who made his debut on the Notorious B.I.G.'s LP, Life After Death LP in 1997. Angelettie released a Mad Rapper album, Tell 'Em Why U Madd, in 2000 through his label, Crazy Cat Catalogue distributed through Columbia/Sony Records in 2000. The album featured the up and coming rapper 50 Cent on the song "How To Rob". The Tell 'Em Why U Madd LP also introduced a new, young producer by the name of Kanye West, who D-Dot also managed and mentored. Crazy Cat Catalogue music label is currently distributed through The Orchard/Sony Music Distribution.

D-Dot has appeared on and produced the title song for MTVʼs reality show Making The Band 1 & 2. He has co-hosted the television show Hip-Hop Hold 'Em on the UPN and was the "Music Consultant" for the "Notorious" movie on Fox/Searchlight Pictures - 2009.

Angelettie owns and runs Angelettie Global LLC. Companies under Angelettie Global are Crazy Cat Catalogue record label, Connect The Dots Consulting, LLC., a management and strategy company and Crazy Cat Cinemas, a film production company. Angelettie is an Executive Producer for the show "Rules To This $hit" released on Complex/BET/Viacom Network in 2018, and is an Associate Producer on the film Steps-The Movie, Executive Produced by Shaquille OʼNeal that is currently on streaming platforms.

Career and Production Discography

Two Kings in a Cipher 
While attending Howard University from 1986 to 1989, Angelettie and his friend Ron "Amen-Ra" Lawrence formed the conscious rap Two Kings in a Cipher. In 1990, the duo signed a recording deal to RCA/Bahia. In 1990, they debuted their first single "Movin 'On 'Em" and in 1991, they released their debut album From Pyramids to Projects. The album received critical acclaim but the duo was dropped from RCA in 1993.

Bad Boy Entertainment 
After moving back to NYC from D.C., D-Dot joined Bad Boy Entertainment in 1993 and in a 5-year span, Angelettie went from intern, to director of merchandising and management, to booking shows for artists Craig Mack and the Notorious B.I.G., to managing R&B diva Mary J. Blige on her My Life Tour (1994-1996), to becoming the head of Bad Boy's A&R Department as vice-president, and then finally in 1996 becoming the "captain" of the Hitmen — Bad Boy's in-house production team.

As a producer and songwriter, D-Dot produced and wrote multi-platinum songs for legendary artists such as Jay-Z, 50 Cent, Mary J. Blige, Outkast and Eminem among many others. He produced and wrote mega hits such as Diddy's "It's All About the Benjamins", and the Notorious B.I.G's "Hypnotize", and has sold over 30 million records as a producer, executive producer, songwriter and artist.

Angelettie executive-produced multi-platinum albums for the Notorious B.I.G., Puff Daddy, Mase, Faith Evans, the Lox, Black Rob, and Da Band.

As a producer, Angelettie's credits also include songs for artists: Lil' Kim, Nas, Nicki Minaj, Busta Rhymes. Angelettie has managed artists such as Kanye West.

The Madd Rapper 
The Madd Rapper persona debuted on a skit on the Notorious B.I.G.'s second LP (Life After Death) in 1997. In 2000 he had to drop the  word "the" and the "d" from The Madd Rapper due to legal issues with MADD. The new stage name became Mad Rapper. Angelettie's alter ego released his debut album, Tell 'Em Why U Madd, on his own Crazy Cat Catalogue Label  in 1999. The album featured guest appearances from Puff Daddy, Eminem, Busta Rhymes, Raekwon, Jermaine Dupri, Lil' Cease. The album also introduced young rapper 50 Cent and young producer Kanye West.

On November 19, 1998, Angelettie was charged with participating in the assault of Blaze Magazine editor Jesse Washington. Washington claimed that the assault was made because he published a photograph (taken with Angelettie's consent) that revealed the Madd Rapper's identity, which up until that time had been concealed from the general public but widely known in the music industry. The editor and Angelettie settled out of court.

Business 
Angelettie has appeared on MTVʼs reality show Making the Band 1 & 2. He has co-hosted the television show "Hip-Hop Hold 'Em" on UPN, and was the "Music Consultant" for the "Notorious" movie  on Fox/Searchlight Pictures - 2009. Angelettie also owns and runs Connect the Dots, a management and strategy company with clients such as multi-platinum producer, Stevie J from VH1's #1 cable reality show, Love & Hip Hop: Atlanta and Eddie Harris, a screenwriter whose credits include House of Bodies (2014) and Steps (2015). Angelettie was a producer on the film Steps, and executive producer of the documentary Rules To This $hit], distributed through Complex Networks.

Personal life 
Angelettie was born and raised an only child in Brooklyn, New York, to an African-American father Eric Angelettie and a Puerto Rican mother Dr. Noemi Angelettie-Wallace. He graduated from Samuel J Tilden High School in 1986 and then later attended Howard University in Washington, D.C., and dropped out in 1989 to pursue his music career. He is married to author Lisa Angelettie and has four daughters.

Studio albums (as an artist)

Two Kings in a Cipher
 From Pyramids to Projects (Bahia Ent./RCA)

Madd Rapper
 Tell 'Em Why U Madd (Crazy Cat/Columbia Records/Sony)

Mad Rapper 
 Appreciate The Hate - Vol #2 - 2013
 Appreciate The Hate - Vol #3 - 2019 
 Fire Sign - The EP - 2020

Awards

MTV Video Music Awards

Grammy Awards

NARAS Awards

Rolling Stone's 500 Greatest Albums of All Time

Filmography 

 Behind The Music (2001) - Self
 Driven (Lil' Kim) (2003) - Self
 Making The Band 1 & 2 (2004) - Self, Music Producer
 Hip-Hop Hold 'Em (2006) - Host
 E! True Hollywood Story (2006) - Self
 Life After Death: The Movie (2007) - Self
 Notorious (2009) - Music Consultant 
 Rules To This Shit (2019) - Executive Producer
 Steps - The Movie (2021) - Associate Producer
 Neutralize (2021) - Producer

References

External links
Mad Rapper bandcamp page

1968 births
Living people
Bad Boy Records artists
American hip hop record producers
American hip hop musicians
Rappers from New York City
Record producers from New York (state)
20th-century American rappers
21st-century American rappers
Grammy Award winners for rap music